Mount Massive is the second-highest summit of the Rocky Mountains of North America and the U.S. state of Colorado. It ranks as the third-highest peak in the contiguous United States after Mount Whitney and Mount Elbert.

Mountain
Mount Massive was first surveyed and climbed in 1873 during the Hayden Survey of the American West. Survey member Henry Gannett is credited with the first ascent.

A matter of some contention after the Great Depression arose over the heights of Massive and its neighbor, Mount Elbert, which have a height difference of only .  This led to an ongoing dispute which came to a head with the Mount Massive supporters taking it upon themselves to build large piles of stones on the summit to boost its height, only to have the Mount Elbert proponents demolish them.

A class 2 hiking path leads to the peak from the eastern face. The path is  round trip, with a  elevation gain.

There are several glacial lakes in the wilderness area. The lower slopes of the mountain are covered in lodgepole pine forests, which gradually yield to Engelmann Spruce and Fir. Treeline is just below 12,000 feet.  Among the mountain's fauna are the American pika, the mountain goat, elk, mule deer, moose, Canada jay, martin, and the yellow-bellied marmot.

See also

List of mountain peaks of North America
List of mountain peaks of the United States
List of mountain peaks of Colorado
List of Colorado fourteeners

Notes

References

External links

 

Massive
Massive
San Isabel National Forest
Massive
Massive